On 2 February 1985, Bobby's Bar in Glyfada, a suburb of Athens in Greece, was bombed. The bar was popular with American airmen stationed at the nearby Hellenikon Air Base. Police spokesman Nikos Gizas said about fifty of the injured were Americans. Some of them were brought to U.S. bases in West Germany for treatment.

Responsibility
A far-right group calling itself National Front claimed responsibility. A caller claiming to be from the group claimed that the bombing was aimed at Americans who were "responsible" for the occupation of Cyprus, which had been divided since the Turkish invasion of Cyprus in 1974. Sources claim that an organization called 'National Front' was formed in 1968 as a predecessor to the EOKA-B Greek-Cypriot nationalist group. The group is listed in a book on terrorism.

See also
 List of right-wing terrorist attacks
1988 Naples bombing
1987 Greece bus attacks

References

1985 in Greece
1985 in military history
Explosions in 1985
February 1985 events in Europe
1985 crimes in Greece
Terrorist incidents in Europe in 1985
Terrorist incidents in Greece in the 1980s
Terrorist incidents in Greece
1980s in Athens
Attacks on bars in Europe
Building bombings in Europe
Anti-Americanism